Kfarchouba, also known as Kafrchouba and Kafr Shuba, is a Lebanese village in the Hasbaya District of the Nabatieh Governorate in Southern Lebanon.The people of the village are Sunni Muslims. It is situated in the region of Arkoub, at 1256 m above sea level and 130 km from Beirut. Located on the border of Israel near the Golan Heights, not far from the Shebaa Farms, it overlooks in depth both Israel and the Lebanese Bekaa, which makes it a strategic military location. The Lebanese Army, as well as Hezbollah, say that that Israel is still occupying the general area in which the village is located, known as the Kfar Chouba Hills. It stands in mountainous terrain.

History
The village was occupied by Israeli troops during a punitive mission, in the wake of fedayeen attacks inside Israel, on the 26 of February 1972, and was devastated by a major Israeli attack conducted in January 1975. It was bombed and rocketed by Israeli warcraft further on 15 June, and shelled again by Israeli artillery on 31 August, of that year.

It was struck by Israeli air raids and artillery fire in April 2002.

During the Israeli invasion in 2006, 60 houses were completely destroyed, and 650 were damaged. Currently, over 90% of the population of Kfarchouba lives outside Lebanon. A total of 800 houses make up the village. The school was rebuilt in the 90s. After the return of some immigrants in 2006, a second section was built.

In retaliation for a Hezbollah retaliatory strike against an Israeli patrol on the 28 January 2015, the village was shelled by IDF artillery fire, together with the two other border villages of Majidiyeh, Abbasiyeh.

The mosque in the village was destroyed in 1972 and partially rebuilt.

Kfarchouba is the second largest village in southern Lebanon, which also contains the largest number of young graduates in the Caza of Hasbaya.

Landmarks
 The Shkif (in Arabic الشقيف)
 Ajami, and Mobaraki Sheikh Salam: Considered to be The three major holy chains.

Large families and notables
 Largest families: Al-Kadri (القادري), Kassab (قصب), Abdallah (عبدالله), Diab (ذياب), Ghanem (غانم), Chibli (شبلي), Saleh(صالح)
 President of the municipal council: Dr Kassem El Kadiri
 Mayors: Mohammad Kassab (Abu Naser), Mohamad Hamed, Ali Salah Diab
 Director of Secondary school: Mohamad El Kadiri
 Director of primary school: Ahmad Toufic Kassab

Agriculture
Kfarchouba farms produce olives (over 100 tonnes in 2006 including olive oil), figs, grapes, and cherries.

References

External links
Kfar Chouba (Nkhayleh), Localiban
 www.kafarchouba.com

Populated places in Hasbaya District